Raven's Gate is the first book in The Power of Five series, written by Anthony Horowitz. It was published and released in the United Kingdom on 1 August 2005, by Walker Books Ltd and in the United States (1 June 2005) by Scholastic Press under the adjusted series title The Gatekeepers. It is followed by Evil Star, released in 2006, Nightrise in 2007, and Necropolis in 2008, with the final book Oblivion in 2012.

Plot
After being arrested for breaking and entering an Ipswich warehouse, 14-year-old delinquent Matthew 'Matt' Freeman is enrolled in a teenage rehabilitation program and sent to a farm in the village of Lesser Malling, Yorkshire. The farm is run by the stern spinster, Jayne Deverill, whose sister, Claire, is also a spinster and the local primary school's headmistress. While there, Matt experiences various unexplained phenomena and discovers a confidential file suggesting he possesses psychic abilities. A farmer called Tom Burgess tells Matt to come to his farmhouse the next day and he will help him leave. Visiting the farm the next day, Matt finds Burgess dead and the place wrecked. The words "Raven's Gate" have been painted on one wall of the bedroom. All of Matt’s attempts to inform the authorities are mysteriously thwarted, in part thanks to the villagers of Lesser Malling.

Several days later, Matt follows Jayne and Claire Deverill into the woods and watches them perform a dark magic ritual. He tries to eavesdrop, but triggers a security alarm. Jayne Deverill summons two black demon dogs, which chase him through the woods and trap him in a bog. Matt is rescued by Richard Cole, a journalist who he had previously contacted about the Burgess murder. At Richard's flat in York, he hears Matt's full story.

Richard and Matt make contact with a man called Dravid, who works at the British Museum. Dravid informs Matt that all the villagers in Lesser Malling, including the Deverill sisters, are part of a cult which worships a group of demons known as the Old Ones, who used to rule the world before being banished by five children over ten thousand years previously. Lesser Malling was once home to a gate to the Old Ones' prison, known as Raven’s Gate, and the villagers intend to have Matt ritually sacrificed in order to bring them back and rule the world.

Dravid is killed by dark magic that brings the skeletons of dinosaurs in the museum to life. Jayne Deverill captures Richard and Matt, taking them back to Lesser Malling for the sacrifice. The villagers succeed in opening a portal to the Old Ones' dimension and a huge dark creature, King of the Old Ones, appears in the gate. The King tries to free himself, but Matt's power awakens. He stops the sacrifice, saves Richard, and forces the King to retreat. In the process, the Deverills and all the other villagers die.

In the next few weeks, a society named the Nexus, to which Dravid belonged, tells Matt and Richard that another gate is opening in Peru.

Comparison with The Devil's Doorbell 
The Power of Five series is based on another series of books written by Anthony Horowitz between 1983 and 1989, entitled Pentagram. The Pentagram series was meant to have five books, but only four were ever published. The first was called The Devil's Doorbell, on which Raven's Gate is based.

Awards
Raven's Gate won the Lancashire Children's Book of the Year award in 2006. This is Horowitz's second time winning this award after his first win in 1989 for his children's novel Groosham Grange.

Adaptations
A graphic novel adaptation written for Walker Books by UK writer Tony Lee and drawn by artists Dom Reardon and Lee O'Connor was released on 3 August 2010. It was then re-issued with a new cover to coincide with then upcoming releases of the graphic novel adaptations for Evil Star and Nightrise on 6 June 2013. 

In 2012, Horowitz tweeted that he had finished writing a 99 page screenplay of Raven's Gate, describing it as “a bit like Terminator but with demons”. However, Horowitz confirmed in 2021 that despite his wishes, there has been no further development as of yet on any possible film or TV adaptation of Raven’s Gate or of the Power of Five series as a whole.

References

External links
The Power of Five official website
The Power of Five official Scholastic website

2005 British novels
English fantasy novels
Novels by Anthony Horowitz
Novels set in Yorkshire
British horror novels
Walker Books books